The Yule log, Yule clog, or Christmas block is a specially selected log burnt on a hearth as a winter tradition in regions of Europe, and subsequently North America. The origin of the folk custom is unclear. Like other traditions associated with Yule (such as the Yule boar), the custom may ultimately derive from Proto-Indo-European religion as similar traditions have been recorded in Celtic, Germanic, Baltic and Slavic paganism, among others.

American folklorist Linda Watts provides the following overview of the custom:
The familiar custom of burning the Yule log dates back to earlier solstice celebrations and the tradition of bonfires. The Christmas practice calls for burning a portion of the log each evening until Twelfth Night (January 6). The log is subsequently placed beneath the bed for luck, and particularly for protection from the household threats of lightning and, with some irony, fire. Many have beliefs based on the yule log as it burns, and by counting the sparks and such, they seek to discern their fortunes for the new year and beyond.
Watts notes that the Yule log is one of various "emblem[s] of divine light" that feature in winter holiday customs (other examples include the Yule fire and Yule candle).

Origins
According to the Dictionary of English Folklore, although the concept of Yule extends far into the ancient Germanic record long before Christianization, the first "clear" references to the tradition appear in the 17th century, and thus it is unclear from where or when exactly the custom extends. However, it has long been observed that the custom may have much earlier origins, extending from customs observed in Germanic paganism. As early as 1725, Henry Bourne sought an origin for the Yule log in Anglo-Saxon paganism:
Our Fore-Fathers, when the common Devices of Eve were over, and Night was come on, were wont to light up Candles of an uncommon Size, which were called Christmas-Candles, and to lay a Log of Wood upon the Fire, which they termed a Yule-Clog, or Christmas-Block. These were to Illuminate the House, and turn the Night into Day; which custom, in some Measure, is still kept up in the Northern Parts. It hath, in all probability, been derived from the Saxons. For Bede tells us, That [sic] this very Night was observed in this Land before, by the Heathen Saxons. They began, says he, their Year on the Eight of the Calenders of January, which is now our Christmas Party: And the very Night before, which is now Holy to us, was by them called Mædrenack, or the Night of the Mothers … The Yule-Clog therefore hath probably been a Part of those Ceremonies which were perform'd that Night's Ceremonies. It seems to have been used, as an Emblem of the return of the Sun, and the lengthening of the Days. For as both December and January were called Guili or Yule, upon Account of the Sun's Returning, and the Increase of the Days; so, I am apt to believe, the Log has had the Name of the Yule-Log, from its being burnt as an Emblem of the returning Sun, and the Increase of its Light and Heat. This was probably the Reason of the custom among the Heathen Saxons; but I cannot think the Observation of it was continued for the same Reason, after Christianity was embraced. …"

More recently, G. R. Willey (1983) says:
Communal bon-bons with feasting and jollification have a pagan root—ritual bonfires at the beginning of November once signaled the start of another year and the onset of winter. Their subsequent incorporation into the Christian calendar, to become part and parcel of the festival of Christmas, and, later, their association with the New Year (January 1st) is an intriguing story. Many, if not all, of the various customs and traditions at one time extensively witnessed at Christmas and the 'old' New Year stem from this common source, e.g. Twelfth Night bonfires, including 'Old Meg' from Worcestershire and burning the bush from Herefordshire, first footing, etc. … Any traces of primitive ritual such as scattering of burnt ashes or embers as an omen of fertilisation or purification have long since disappeared.

The events of Yule were generally held to have centred on Midwinter (although specific dating is a matter of debate), and feasting, drinking, and sacrifice (blót) were involved. Scholar Rudolf Simek comments that the pagan Yule feast "had a pronounced religious character" and that "it is uncertain whether the Germanic Yule feast still had a function in the cult of the dead and in the veneration of the ancestors, a function which the mid-winter sacrifice certainly held for the West European Stone and Bronze Ages." Yule customs and the traditions of the Yule log, Yule goat, and Yule boar (Sonargöltr) are still reflected in the Christmas ham, Yule singing, and others, which Simek takes as "indicat[ing] the significance of the feast in pre-Christian times."

Diffusion and modern practices
The first mention of a log burned around Christmas comes from Robert Herrick's poetry collection of 1648 where it is called a "Christmas log". It is not referred to as a "Yule log" until John Aubrey's work from 1686. Prior to that century, there has been no evidence of Yule logs let alone evidence that can be traced back to the holiday of Yule.

The Yule log is recorded in the folklore archives of much of England, but particularly in collections covering the West Country and the North Country. For example, in his section regarding "Christmas Observances", J. B. Partridge recorded then-current (1914) Christmas customs in Yorkshire, Britain involving the Yule log as related by "Mrs. Day, Minchinhampton (Gloucestershire), a native of Swaledale". The custom is as follows:
The Yule log is generally given, and is at once put on the hearth. It is unlucky to have to light it again after it has once been started, and it ought not go out until it has burned away.
To sit around the Yule log and tell ghost stories is a great thing to do on this night, also card-playing.
Two large coloured candles are a Christmas present from the grocery. Just before supper on Christmas Eve (where furmety is eaten), while the Yule log is burning, all other lights are put out, and the candles are lit from the Yule log by the youngest person present. While they are lit, all are silent and wish. It is common practice for the wish to be kept a secret. Once the candles are on the table, silence may be broken. They must be allowed to burn themselves out, and no other lights may be lit that night.

H. J. Rose records a similar folk belief from Killinghall, Yorkshire in 1923: "In the last generation the Yule log was still burned, and a piece of it saved to light the next year's log. On Christmas morning something green, a leaf or the like, was brought into the house before anything was taken out."

The Yule log is also attested as a custom present elsewhere in the English-speaking world, such as the United States. Robert Meyer, Jr. records in 1947 that a "Yule-Log Ceremony" in Palmer Lake, Colorado had occurred since 1934. He describes the custom: "It starts with the yule log [sic] hunt and is climaxed by drinking of wassail around the fire." In the Southern United States before the end of the American Civil War, the Yule log was also maintained as a tradition. For example, according to scholar Allen Cabaniss:
For slaves, Christmas had special meaning. December was a slow work month on the typical plantation, and it became the social season for them. The slaves' holiday lasted until the Yule log burned, which sometimes took over a week.

Regional variations and analogues

England 
Scholars have observed similarities between the Yule log and the folk custom of the ashen faggot, recorded solely in the West Country of England. First recorded at the beginning of the 19th century, the ashen faggot is burnt on Christmas Eve, is associated with a variety of folk beliefs, and is "made of smaller ash sticks bound into a faggot with strips of hazel, withy, or bramble". G. R. Wiley observes that the ashen faggot may have developed out of the Yule log.

The term "Yule log" is not the only term used to refer to the custom. It was commonly called a "Yule Clog" in north-east England, and it was also called the "Yule Block" in the Midlands and West Country and  "Gule Block" in Lincolnshire. In Cornwall, the term "Stock of the Mock" was found.

Wales 
In Wales it's called Boncyff Nadolig or Blocyn y Gwyliau (the Christmas Log or the Festival Block).

Scotland 
In Scotland it's called Yeel Carline (the Christmas Old Wife).

Ireland 
In Ireland it's called Bloc na Nollag (the Christmas Block).

Germany 
In Germany, where it’s called Christklotz, Christbrand, Christblock, Julklotz or Julblock it was customary, especially in Hesse and Westphalia, to burn the log slowly and then remove it and throw it back on the fire as protection from lightning.

France 
The custom of burning a Yule log for one or more nights starting on Christmas Eve was also formerly widespread in France, where the usual term is bûche de noël. This may derive from a custom requiring peasants to bring a log to their lord. In Burgundy, gifts would be hidden under the log. Prayers were offered as the log was lighted in Brittany and in Provence, where the custom is still widely observed and called cacho fio (blessing of the log): the log, or branch from a fruit-bearing tree, is first paraded three times around the house by the grandfather of the family, then blessed with wine; it is often lighted together with the saved ashes of the previous year's log. Other regional names include cosse de Nau in Berry, mouchon de Nau in Angoumois, chuquet in Normandy, souche in the Île de France, and tréfouiau in the Vendée. The custom has now long been replaced by the eating of a log-shaped cake, also named Bûche de Noël.

Portugal 
In Portugal, the Madeiros de Natal are big bonfires that are lit in the center of the village, in the main square or in the churchyard on Christmas Eve.

The remains of the log were preserved as they were believed to prevent damage usually caused by storms.

Galicia 

Asturias 
In Asturias the Nataliegu burns from December 24 until the new year in the fireplace of many houses and leaves sweet buns for the children. Then his ashes, which were attributed healing and protective powers for the home, were scattered around the house, the stables and other rooms.

Basque Country 
In Basque Country Subilaro-egur also burns until the end of the year. The log gives life to good wishes, burns curses, prevents diseases and ensures good harvests.

It's also called eguberri, gabon, gabonzuzi, gabon-subil, gabon-mukur, olentzero-enbor, onontzoro-mokor, suklaro-egur, sukubela or porrondoko.

Olentzero it's a modern personification of the old log.

High Aragon 
In High Aragon it's called tizón de Nadal. The children of the house are in charge of saying beautiful phrases, blessings and rituals (although in some places the blessing is done by the oldest or owner of the house). Sometimes the blessing is done after filling the log with a little wine while the blessing is said.

In the eastern areas in contact with Catalonia, the ritual has a more playful part, when the children of the house hit the log so it "shits" the presents, which are used to be jellies, candies, nuts and other things to eat or play.

Catalonia 

Catalan People have a similar tradition, where Tió de Nadal is a magic log "fed" before Christmas. Singing children cover the tió with a blanket and beat him with sticks to make the tió defecate nougat candy and small gifts.

Occitania 
In Occitania the “cachafuòc” or “soc de Nadal” it's also one of the traditional elements that accompany and cheer up Christmas.

Tuscany 
In Tuscany, especially in the Val di Chiana (province of Arezzo), it was customary to sing a  prayer during the "cerimonia del ceppo" (log ceremony)  Later, blindfolded children (later rewarded with sweets and other gifts), had to hit the log, while the rest of the family sang a particular song, called "Ave Maria del Ceppo".

Lombardy 
In Lombardy, the head of the family used to sprinkle juniper on the log and place coins on it while reciting a prayer in the name of the Trinity. Then, wine was drunk at will and the remaining wine was thrown by the head of the family on the log; it was also customary, during the log ceremony, to cut three panettone and keep a piece for healing purposes for the whole following year.

Montenegro 
In Montenegro, it was customary to put a piece of bread on the log and -similar to the Lombard custom- sprinkle it with wine.

Balts 
Baltic people also have a similar ritual called "log pulling" where people in a village would drag a log or a tree stump through the village at the winter solstice and then at the end burn it.

Balkans 

Serbian people have a similar tradition in which oak is burned.

As early as Jacob Grimm in the early 19th century, scholars have observed parallels between the South Slavic custom of the Badnjak and the Yule log tradition. As observed by M. E. Durham (1940), the Badnjak is a sapling that is placed on the hearth on Christmas Eve. Varying customs involving the Badnjak may be performed, such as smearing it with fowl blood or goat blood and the ashes may be "strewn on the fields or garden to promote fertility on New Year's Eve".

Greece 
In Greece, the yule log was believed to drive away the kallikantzaroi, the evil monsters of local folklore, from one's home.

United States 
In the United States, a local New York television station first broadcast a six-minute loop of a yule log burning in a fireplace over the course of several hours. The broadcast, called simply Yule Log, premiered in full color on Dec. 24, 1966, at 9:30 p.m. on WPIX (Channel 11 in New York City) and became a yearly tradition. The original Yule Log footage was filmed on 16 millimeter film at Gracie Mansion, New York City's mayoral residence. New footage of a flaming yule log was shot in 1970, in a different location, producing a seven-minute loop on 35 millimeter film. The station still broadcasts the Yule Log for four to five hours every Christmas morning and, through the years, has had many imitators at television stations across the country.

See also
Sacred trees and groves in Germanic paganism and mythology

Notes

References

 Cabaniss, Allen. 2006. Aily Wright "Christmas" in Charles Reagan Wilson, ed. The New Encyclopedia of Southern Culture, vol. 4, pp. 210–211. University of North Carolina Press. 
 Durham, M. E. 1940. "Some Balkan Festivals" in Folklore, Vol. 51, No. 2 (June 1940), pp. 84–89). Taylor and Francis.
 Grimm, Jacob (James Steven Stallybrass trans.). 1882. Teutonic Mythology: Translated from the Fourth Edition with Notes and Appendix Vol. I. London: George Bell and Sons.
 Bourne, Henry. 1777 [1725]. Observations on Popular Antiquities. T. Saint.
 Hutton, Ronald. 1996. The Stations of the Sun: A History of the Ritual Year in Britain. Oxford University Press 
 Meyer Jr., Robert. 1947. "Calendar of Western Folk Events" in Western Folklore, Vol. 6, No. 4 (Oct. 1947), pp. 367–370. Western States Folklore Society.
 Partridge, J. B. 1914. "Folklore from Yorkshire (North Riding)" in Folklore, Vol. 25, No. 3 (Sep. 30, 1914), pp. 375–377. Taylor & Francis.
 Rose, H. J. 1923. "Folklore Scraps" in Folklore, Vol. 34, No. 2 (Jun. 30, 1923), pp. 154–158. Taylor & Francis.
 Simek, Rudolf (Angela Hall trans.). 2007. Dictionary of Northern Mythology. D.S. Brewer 
 Simpson, Jacqueline and Steve Roud (2003). A Dictionary of English Folklore. Oxford University Press. 
 Watts, Linda. 2005. Encyclopedia of American Folklore. Facts on File. 
 Wiley, J. R. 1983. "Burning the Ashen Faggot: A Surviving Somerset Custom". Folklore, Vol. 94, No. 1 (1983), pp. 40–43. Taylor & Francis.

External links

Christmas traditions in Europe
Winter traditions
Traditions involving fire
Yule